Descaves is a French surname. Notable people with the surname include:

Lucette Descaves (1906–1993), French pianist and teacher
Lucien Descaves (1861–1949), French novelist
Pierre Descaves (1924–2014), French politician

French-language surnames